is a Japanese-American 
actress and model, known for her role as Rena on Fashion Story: Model, Nippon Television variety show Hirunandesu!, and Sekai no Hatemade Itte Q!. She is the 2003 winner of the Japan Bishōjo Contest which is a beauty pageant held by Oscar Promotion.

Appearances

Television
 Sekaigumi TV (Fuji TV, 2005-2006), Mayu
 Gakkō ja Oshierarenai! Episode 2 (NTV, 2008)
 Orthros no Inu (TBS, 2009), Shiho Aoi
 Bikōjō Keikaku: Suzuki Rinko, 20-sai (KTV, 2010), Rinko Suzuki
 Best Friend (NHK 1seg2, 2010)
 Don Quixote (NTV, 2011), Eri
 Thumbs up! (BS Fuji, 2011), Reiko
 Mōsō Sousa: Kuwagata Kōichi Junkyōju no Stylish na Seikatsu (TV Asahi, 2012), Mizuho Yamamoto
 Sprout (NTV, 2012), Kiyoka Taniyama
 Tokusō Shirei!  Aichi Police (Nagoya Broadcasting Network, 2012-2013), Aichi Prefectural Police special investigation unit commander
 Mistake! Episode 2 (Fuji TV, 2013)
 Mission: English Eiken Daisakusen (BS Fuji, 2013-2014), Mari Riviere
 Power Game (NHK BS Premium, 2013), Aya Koike
 Hakuba no  Ōji Sama Junai Tekireiki (YTV, 2013), Kaori Higashiyama
 Kurokōchi (TBS, 2013), Tenten
 Yae's Sakura Episode 43, Episode 44 (NHK, 2013), Umeko Tsuda
 Mission: English Eiken Daisakusen Season 2 (BS Fuji, 2014), Mari Riviere
 Shiratori Reiko de Gozaimasu! (tvk, 2016), Reiko Shiratori
 Who is Princess? (2021), Herself (ep. 8)

Web dramas
 Atelier (2015), Yuri Kōno

Films
 Hitori Kakurenbo Gekijōban (2009), Ritsuko Uno
 Professor Layton and the Eternal Diva (2009), Hall announcement
 Fashion Story: Model (2012), Rena
 Kū no Kyōkai (2013), Yūko Sawamura
 Taka no Tsume Go: Utsukushiki Elleair Shōshū Plus (2013), Okitemasu Yorunī
 Kumiko, the Treasure Hunter (2014), Kanazaki
 Shiratori Reiko de Gozaimasu! The Movie (2016), Reiko Shiratori
 Detective Conan: The Fist of Blue Sapphire (2019), Rechel Cheong (voice)

Bibliography

Books
 Kokuminteki Bishōjo: Dai 9-kai Zennihon Kokuminteki Bishōjo Contest (Koudansha, October 2003)

Magazines
 Pretty Style, Shogakukan 2002-2011, as an exclusive model 2008-2011
 ViVi, Koudansha 1983-, as an exclusive model since 2012

References

External links
  
  (be amie - Oscar Promotion Official SNS) 
 

1991 births
Living people
21st-century Japanese actresses
Japanese television actresses
Japanese female models
People from Manhattan
Models from New York City
Actresses from New York City
American people of Japanese descent